John Ireland (1914–1992) was a Canadian-American actor and film director.

John Ireland may also refer to:

 John de Courcy Ireland (1911–2006), Irish historian and activist
 John Ireland (bishop) (1838–1918), Irish-born American Catholic bishop 
 John Ireland (composer) (1879–1962), English composer
 John Ireland (cricketer) (1888–1970), English amateur cricketer
 John Ireland (philatelist) (1882–1965), British philatelist
 John Ireland (pirate) (fl. 1694–1701), American pirate
 John Ireland (politician) (1827–1896), American politician
 John Ireland (Anglican priest) (1761–1842), English Anglican priest and philanthropist
 John Ireland (South African musician) (born 1954), South African pop musician
 John Ireland (sportscaster) (born 1963), American sportscaster
 John Ireland (theologian), Scottish theologian, diplomat, and priest
 John Ireland (writer), (died 1808), British author
 John Busteed Ireland (1823–1913), American lawyer, writer, and landowner
 Jon Ireland (born 1967), Australian tennis player

See also 
 John Ireland Blackburne (1783–1874), British politician, father of the man born 1817
 John Ireland Blackburne (1817–1893), British army officer and politician, son of the man born 1783